The Jubilee Clock Tower is an Moorish-style Jubilee clocktower located at the intersection of Light Street and Beach Street in George Town, Penang, Malaysia. Built to commemorate Queen Victoria's 1897 Diamond Jubilee, the tower is sixty feet tall, one foot for each year of Victoria's reign. A corner of the wall surrounding Fort Cornwallis is situated behind the tower.

The clock tower is slightly tilted, a result of bombing during the Second World War.

See also

 List of tourist attractions in Penang

References

Buildings and structures in George Town, Penang
Clock towers in Malaysia
Inclined towers in Malaysia
Towers completed in 1902
British colonial architecture
Tourist attractions in George Town, Penang